Wilbert Homer Gardiner (March 25, 1913 – August 28, 2001) was a Canadian professional ice hockey player who played 144 games in the National Hockey League between 1935 and 1944. He played with the Montreal Canadiens, Chicago Black Hawks, Boston Bruins, and New York Rangers.

Career statistics

Regular season and playoffs

References

External links
 

1913 births
2001 deaths
Boston Bruins players
Canadian ice hockey goaltenders
Chicago Blackhawks players
Ice hockey people from Saskatchewan
Montreal Canadiens players
New Haven Eagles players
New York Crescents players
New York Rangers players
Philadelphia Ramblers players
Sportspeople from Saskatoon
Washington Lions players